Ternovoye is a rural locality (a selo) and the administrative center of Ternovskoye Rural Settlement, Ostrogozhsky District, Voronezh Oblast, Russia. The population was 704 as of 2010. There are 5 streets.

Geography 
Ternovoye is located 18 km northwest of Ostrogozhsk (the district's administrative centre) by road. Beryozovo is the nearest rural locality.

References 

Rural localities in Ostrogozhsky District